"Hair" is a song by British girl group Little Mix. It was released on August 28, 2015 as the first promotional single from the group's third studio album Get Weird. On April 15, 2016, a remix featuring Jamaican rapper and singer Sean Paul, was released by Syco Music as the final and fourth single.

Musically "Hair" is a electropop and R&B single with lyrics about getting over an ex and taking control of a relationship once it ends. It has been described as a break up anthem. The song reached the top ten of the charts in Australia and Scotland, the top twenty in the United Kingdom and Ireland, and charted in other territories including France, Belgium, and Greece. It was nominated for Best British Video of the Year at the 2017 Brit Awards and been certified platinum by the British Phonographic Industry (BPI). It has been certified double platinum in Australia, tripled platinum in Brazil and gold in Netherlands.

Chart performance
Following its release as an instant " track" in promotion of Get Weird, "Hair" debuted at number 35 on the UK Singles Chart on the week ending 10 September 2015. The new version featuring Sean Paul entered the UK Singles Chart at number 31 on the week ending 28 April 2016, and the single later peaked at number 11. Hair also reached the top 10 spot in Australia and Scotland and also the top 20 within Ireland and Belgium.

Music video
The official music video for "Hair" was released on 20 April 2016 on Vevo and was directed by Director X, who previously directed the video to the album's first single "Black Magic". The video revolves around a sleepover the girls are having while confronting Paul in a FaceTime call after Leigh-Anne had seen a picture of him with a woman on their Instagram feed.

Track listing
Digital download
"Hair" (featuring Sean Paul) – 3:53

Wideboys Remix
 "Hair" (featuring Sean Paul) [Wideboys Remix] – 3:49

Personnel
Electric – songwriter, producer, engineer, instruments, programming
Iain James – songwriter
Camille Purcell – songwriter
Anita Blay - songwriter
Maegan Cottone – vocal producer
Wez Clarke – mixer
Dick Beetham – mastering

Charts

Weekly charts

Year-end charts

Certifications

Release history

References

2015 songs
2016 singles
Little Mix songs
Sean Paul songs
Syco Music singles
Songs written by Edvard Forre Erfjord
Songs written by Henrik Barman Michelsen
Songs written by Iain James
Songs written by Kamille (musician)
Songs about friendship
Songs with feminist themes
Music videos directed by Director X
Songs written by Anita Blay